Sukkur is a city in the Pakistani province of Sindh along the western bank of the Indus River, directly across from the historic city of Rohri. Sukkur is the third largest city in Sindh after Karachi and Hyderabad, and 14th largest city of Pakistan by population. New Sukkur was established during the British era alongside the village of Sukkur. Sukkur's hill, along with the hill on the river island of Bukkur, form what is sometimes considered the "Gate of Sindh".

Etymology 
The name Sukkur may derive from the Arabic word for "sugar," shakkar, in reference to the sugarcane fields that have historically been abundant in the region. This may be an allusion to the relative prosperity of the region at the time.  Others have suggested the name may derive from the word Suukh, derived from a Sindhi word for "comfort."

History 
The region around Sukkur has been inhabited for millennia. The ruins of Lakhan-jo-daro, located near an industrial park on the outskirts of Sukkur, date from the Mature Harappan period of the Indus Valley Civilization, between 2600 BCE and 1900 BCE covers more than 300 Hectares of area and is touted to be second largest city of the Indus Valley Civilization just 75 Kilometers away from another major city of Indus Valley Civilization, Mohenjo Daro

"Old Sukkur" was initially a small village prior to the establishment of a military garrison in 1839. Sukkur was built on a low limestone ridge on the banks of the Indus River. The city was once surrounded by groves of date palms that were traditionally believed to have grown from the discarded date-pits from Arab invaders in the 8th century.

The village of Sukkur was directly across from the larger town of Rohri, which served as a busy port along the Indus by the 1200s, and was a major trading centre for agricultural produce.

British 

Modern Sukkur, or New Sukkur, was built during British rule alongside what was once a small village directly across from the historic city of Rohri. The British established a military garrison here in 1839, which was abandoned in 1845, though Sukkur continued to grow in importance as a trading center. The Sukkur Municipality was constituted in 1862.

Completed in 1889, Sukkur's Lansdowne Bridge connects the Sukkur to Rohri across the Indus, and was one of the first bridges to cross the river. The bridge made the journey between Karachi and Multan easier. The bridge was built with two large pylons rather than a series of pillars extending across the river - a cutting-edge design for such an expansive span. The bridge was also made of metal, and features an unusual design.

Sukkur Barrage (formerly called Lloyd Barrage), built under the British Raj on the Indus River, controls one of the largest irrigation systems in the world. It was designed by Sir Arnold Musto KCIE, and constructed under the overall direction of Sir Charlton Harrison between 1923 and 1932.

On the eve of the Partition of British India in 1947, Sukkur's old town was home to about 10,000 residents, while New Sukkur was home to 80,000.

Modern
After the formation of Pakistan most of the city's Hindu population migrated to India, though like much of Sindh, Sukkur did not experience the widespread rioting that occurred in Punjab and Bengal. According to the 1941 census, about 70% of the population of Sukkur was Hindu, this number decreased to 2% by the 1951 census as a result of the partition. However, less than 500 Hindus were killed in all of Sindh between 1947 and 1948 as Sindhi Muslims largely resisted calls to turn against their Hindu neighbours. Hindus did not flee Sukkur en masse until riots erupted in Karachi on 6 January 1948, which sowed fear in Sindh's Hindus despite the fact that the riots were local and related to Sikh refugees from Punjab seeking refuge in Karachi. Muslim refugees from India settled in Sukkur.

The Sindh Industrial Trading Estate in Sukkur was established in 1950. The Ayub Bridge was built in 1962, and spans the Indus River alongside the British-era Landsdowne Bridge. The city suffered major flooding during the 2010 Pakistan floods which inundated large parts of the city.

Geography

The small Eocene limestone outcropping upon which Sukkur was founded is the most significant land deformation on the vast plains along the Indus Valley in Sindh and Punjab. The outcropping is part of the "Jacobabad-Khairpur High" and Rohri Hills. The outcropping, along with the similar outcropping on Bukkar Island are sometimes referred to as the "Sukkur Gorge," and has historically served as the traditional northern boundary of Sindh.

Climate
Sukkur has a hot desert climate (Köppen climate classification BWh), characterised by extremely hot and hazy summers with warm winters. Sukkur is known for its extremely hot summers, and was described as the hottest city in British India. Wind speed is low throughout the year, and sunshine is abundant. Summer temperatures regularly surpass . Dry heat is experienced starting April to early June until the Monsoon season starts to arrive. Monsoons in Sukkur are not very wet, but bring high dew points, resulting in high heat indices. Monsoons recede by September, but it is not until late October that the short lived autumn season is experienced before the onset of the region's cool winters.

Demography

Sukkur is the third largest city in Sindh after Karachi and Hyderabad. The population of Sukkur is 551,357 according to the 2017 Census of Pakistan. Around 70% of the population speaks Sindhi natively, while 20% of the population speaks Urdu natively. Roughly 96% of the city is Muslim, while the remaining 4% comprise other minorities, overwhelmingly Hindus.

Economy
Sukkur's economy is largely reliant upon the agricultural produce from northern Sindh's farms, and serves as a trading and processing center for agricultural goods. The city also once had a bustling shipbuilding industry.

Sukkur is well-connected to the rest of Pakistan by road and rail, which in turn has attracted new industries such as chemical manufacturing, metalworking, and cement manufacturing.

Agriculture
Sukkur had a large fertile and cultivable land area. During kharif, rice, bajra, cotton, tomatoes and peas are cultivated; whereas during rabi the main crops are wheat, barley, graham and melons. Sukkur is famous, world over, for its dates. Sukkur also has a large Riveraine forest along the course of the Indus. These tropical forests are found within the protective embankments on either side of the Indus.

Transportation

Road
The city will be connected to Multan by M-5 motorway, with onwards motorway connections to Lahore, Islamabad, and Peshawar. Sukkur will also be connected to Hyderabad by the M-6 motorway, with onwards connections to Karachi via the M-9 motorway. The M-5 and M-6 are being built as part of the wider China-Pakistan Economic Corridor.

Rail
Sukkur railway station serves as the city's main rail station. Passenger services are provided exclusively by Pakistan Railways. The city's station is serviced by the Jaffar Express that runs between Rawalpindi and Quetta, the Sukkur Express that runs between Karachi and Jacobabad, and the Akbar Express that runs between Quetta and Peshawar.

Air
Sukkur Airport, located 8 km outside of the city, is served by Pakistan International Airlines, with direct flights to Karachi, Lahore, and Islamabad.

Administration
The city of Sukkur is the capital of Sukkur Division and Sukkur District. Sukkur District has four Tehsils (Talukas) and many Union Councils. Sukkur is home to one of three circuit benches of the Sindh High Court.

Education

The Sukkur IBA University (previously Sukkur Institute of Business Administration or Sukkur IBA) is a business school founded in 1994. The institute is ranked 3rd among the five independent business schools of Pakistan included in the Higher Education Commission Pakistan Business School Ranking 2013. 

Begum Nusrat Bhutto Women University is the public sector University exclusively for women. Established on 50 Acre of land at the Rohri Bypass N-5 National Highway

The Ghulam Muhammad Mahar Medical College is a constituent College of Shaheed Mohtarma Benazir Bhutto Medical University.

The Aror University of Art, Architecture, Design and Heritages is established near Sukkur at Rohri bypass N-5 National Highway. The University will offer the graduate, postgraduate an advance studies in the field of architecture, textile design, photography, interior design, communication design, ceramics and other disciplines.

Islamia Science College Sukkur was founded by the Syed Hasan Mian Advocate and he remained the Chief Patron of the College till his death, Syed Hasan Mian advocate with the help of Noble families of Sukkur founded 25 Schools and Vocational centers in Sukkur. He was the General Sec of All India Muslim League and close associate of Founder of Pakistan Quaid e Azam Mohammad Ali Jinnah.

Notable people

 Mir Muhammad Masum Nami (d. 1606): Born to Shaikh-ul-Islam of Bhakkar of that time. He authored Tarikh-i-Masumi (aka Tarikh-i-Sind), a book on history of the Sindh province from the start of Muhammad Bin Qasim's arrival in Sindh to the beginning of 17th century. Mufradat-i-Nami was book written on medicine by him. He wrote a Diwan of poetry and versified the translation of legend of Sassi Pannu.

 Hemu Kalani, martyr
 Sardar Ghulam Muhammad Khan Mahar
 Syed Nasir Hussain Shah
 Abdul Hafeez Pirzada
 Syed Khurshid Shah, Leader of Opposition for National Assembly of Pakistan from June 2013 to May 2018.
 Islam Ud Din Shaikh, Member of Senate of Pakistan since March 2015. 
 Nouman Islam Shaikh, Member National Assembly of Pakistan, NA-207 (Sukkur-II),	NA-198 (Sukkur-cum-Shikarpur-I).
 Dr Sana Ramchand Gulwani, first female Hindu civil servant from Pakistan Administrative Service.

See also
 Alor and Arora
 Ghulam Muhammad Mahar Medical College
 List of educational institutions in Sukkur
 Sukkur IBA University
 Begum Nusrat Bhutto Women University
 Aror University of Art, Architecture, Design and Heritages

References

Bibliography

External links

 
 Sukkur
 Ghulam Muhammad Maher Medical College, Sukkur
 ADB Report on Sukkur Barrage 2001
 An Overview of the History and Impacts of the Water Issue in Pakistan 
 Pakistan Floods Situation Report, 26 July 2005

 
Metropolitan areas of Pakistan
Populated places in Sukkur District